is a Japanese actor who is represented by the talent agency Sony Music Artists.

Filmography

TV series

Films

References

External links
  

Japanese male actors
1966 births
Living people
People from Kyoto